The statue of singer and actress Anita Mui was installed on Hong Kong's Avenue of Stars, along Tsim Sha Tsui's waterfront in Kowloon, in 2014. The statue has been relocated to the Tsim Sha Tsui East Waterfront Podium Garden temporarily, during an ongoing waterfront revitalisation project.

References

External links

 
 

2014 establishments in Hong Kong
2014 sculptures
Mui, Anita
Mui, Anita
Mui, Anita
Monuments and memorials in Hong Kong
Mui, Anita
Mui, Anita
Mui, Anita
Mui, Anita
Mui, Anita
Tsim Sha Tsui